László Szlamka (born 18 September 1943) is a Hungarian former swimmer. He competed in two events at the 1964 Summer Olympics.

References

1943 births
Living people
Hungarian male swimmers
Olympic swimmers of Hungary
Swimmers at the 1964 Summer Olympics
Swimmers from Budapest